David Barker Jr. (January 8, 1797 – April 1, 1834) was an American politician and a U.S. Representative from New Hampshire.

Early life
Born in Stratham, New Hampshire, Barker was the eldest son of Col. David Barker and at age eleven attended Phillips Exeter Academy, Exeter. He began attending Harvard University at the age of fourteen and earned a degree in 1815. He began the study of law with John P. Hale, Esq.; earned a second degree and was admitted to the bar in 1819.

Career
Upon his admission to the bar, Barker began his law practice in Rochester, New Hampshire. He served as member of the New Hampshire House of Representatives in 1823, 1825, and 1826.

Elected as an Adams candidate to the Twentieth Congress, Barker served as a United States Representative for New Hampshire from March 4, 1827 to March 3, 1829. He resumed the practice of law after his term in Congress and was an original member of the New Hampshire Historical Society.

Death
Barker died in Rochester, Strafford County, New Hampshire, on April 1, 1834 (age 37 years, 83 days). He is interred at Old Rochester Cemetery, Rochester, New Hampshire.

Family life
Barker married Mary Upham on October 2, 1823, and they had two children, David and Mary.

References

External links

1797 births
1834 deaths
People from Stratham, New Hampshire
New Hampshire National Republicans
Members of the United States House of Representatives from New Hampshire
Phillips Exeter Academy alumni
Harvard University alumni
National Republican Party members of the United States House of Representatives